Pelvic lift (also known as pelvic tilt) is an exercise to strengthen the lower back, glute muscles, lower abdominal muscles, and maintain hip muscle balance. It does not require weights, although they can be placed on the stomach.

Steps
There are four steps in the exercise.
The person lies on their back with knees bent
 They slowly raise their buttocks and pelvis off the floor as high as possible
 Hold position
 Repeat

Benefits

The pelvic floor is a "broad sling of muscles, ligaments and sheet-like tissues that stretch from your pubic bone at the front of your body, to the base of your spine at the back".

The pelvic floor is resistant to stretch and weight as it bounces back. However, after carrying weight for long periods of time, it can become stretched. Additionally, weight on the pelvic floor can weaken its resistance and contribute to its loss of shape over time.

Performing this exercise routinely can strengthen glutes, abs, and lower back muscles. As a result, doctors may recommend pelvic lifts to reduce lower back pain, improve posture, and improve bladder control.

References

Physical exercise
Bodyweight exercises
Aerobic exercise